Anito, also spelled anitu, refers to ancestor spirits, nature spirits, and deities in the indigenous Philippine folk religions from the precolonial age to the present, although the term itself may have other meanings and associations depending on the Filipino ethnic group. It can also refer to carved humanoid figures, the taotao, made of wood, stone, or ivory, that represent these spirits. Anito (a term predominantly used in Luzon) is also sometimes known as diwata in certain ethnic groups (especially among Visayans).

Pag-anito refers to a séance, often accompanied by other rituals or celebrations, in which a shaman (Visayan: babaylan, Tagalog: katalonan) acts as a medium to communicate directly with the spirits. When a nature spirit or deity is specifically involved, the ritual is called pagdiwata. The act of worship or a religious sacrifice to a spirit is also sometimes simply referred to as anito.

The belief in anito are sometimes referred to as Anitism in scholarly literature (Spanish: anitismo or anitería).

Spirits
Pre-colonial Filipinos were animistic. They believed that everything has a spirit, from rocks and trees to animals and humans to natural phenomena. These spirits are collectively known as anito, derived from Proto-Malayo-Polynesian *qanitu and Proto-Austronesian *qaNiCu ("spirit of the dead"). Cognates in other Austronesian cultures include the Micronesian aniti, Malaysian and Indonesian hantu or antu, Nage nitu, and Polynesian atua and aitu. As well as Tao anito, Taivoan alid, Seediq and Atayal utux, Bunun hanitu or hanidu, and Tsou hicu among Taiwanese aborigines. Anito can be divided into two main categories: the ancestor spirits (ninunò), and deities and nature spirits (diwata).

Ancestor spirits

The ninunò (lit. "ancestor") can be the spirits of actual ancestors, cultural heroes, or generalized guardian spirits of a family. Pre-colonial Filipinos believed that upon death, the "free" soul (Visayan: kalag; Tagalog: kaluluwa) of a person travels to a spirit world, usually by voyaging across an ocean on a boat (a bangka or baloto).

There can be multiple locations in the spirit world, varying in different ethnic groups. Which place souls end up in depends on how they died, the age at death, or the conduct of the person when they were alive. There was no concept of heaven or hell prior to the introduction of Christianity and Islam; rather, the spirit world is usually depicted as an otherworld that exists alongside the material world. Souls reunite with deceased relatives in the spirit world and lead normal lives in the spirit world as they did in the material world. In some cases, the souls of evil people undergo penance and cleansing before they are granted entrance into a particular spirit realm. Souls would eventually reincarnate after a period of time in the spirit world.

In some cultures (like among the Kalinga people), the acceptance of a soul by ancestors into a certain realm in the spirit world requires tattoos (batok), by which they can gauge the worthiness of a soul. In other cultures, tattoos illuminate and guide the spirits during the journey to the afterlife.

Souls in the spirit world still retain a degree of influence in the material world, and vice versa. Pag-anito may be used to invoke good ancestor spirits for protection, intercession (kalara or kalda), or advice. Ancestor spirits that become intercessors with deities are known as pintakasi or pitulon. Vengeful spirits of the dead can manifest as apparitions or ghosts (mantiw) and cause harm to living people. Pag-anito can be used to appease or banish them. Ancestor spirits also figured prominently during illness or death, as they were believed to be the ones who call the soul to the spirit world, guide the soul (a psychopomp), or meet the soul upon arrival.

Ancestor spirits are also known as kalading among the Igorot; tonong among the Maguindanao and Maranao; umboh among the Sama-Bajau; nunò or umalagad among Tagalogs and Visayans; nonò among Bicolanos; umagad or umayad among the Manobo; and tiladmanin among the Tagbanwa.

Nature spirits and deities

Spirits that have never been human are differentiated in some ethnic groups as diwata. These spirits can range from simple spirits like the diwata of a particular inanimate object, plant, animal, or place, to deities who personify abstract concepts and natural phenomena,  to deities who are part of an actual pantheon. They are also known as dewatu, divata, duwata, ruwata, dewa, dwata, diya, etc., in various Philippine languages (including Tagalog diwa, "spirit" or "essence"); from pre-colonial Philippines meaning "spiritual faery".

However, what entities are considered diwata varies by ethnic group. In some ethnic groups like the B'laan, Cuyonon Visayans, and the Tagalog, Diwata refers to the Magical Spirits of the Elements of the Land, and the Nature Ancestor Guardian Spirits in the pre-colonial, nature-based animistic pantheon, in which case there are different terms for non-human spirits.

In traditional, pre-colonial, nature-based Philippines, many of the syncretic animist traditions pay respect to the ancestor spirits, who are believed to be elemental dwellers. The traditional pre-colonial belief of the Filipino people call magical spirit guardians, who protect and watch the children, the land, and the elementals (earth, wind, water, fire, and trees and all sunlight bearing plants, both daylight and nighttime) are guarded and protected by the elemental nature-based guardians, called "Diwata" (forest, and nature faeries). Tradition in pre-colonist animistic, nature-based belief systems in the island archipelago of the Philippines traditionally and originally refer to ancestor spirits of the land, sky and the sea, who protect and watch the land, elementals and the trees, rivers and all the spiritual dwellings of nature ("Diwata", "Nuno", "Nuno sa Puno" and "Nuno sa Punso", and many other ancestor's spirit guardians) are respectfully addressed in polite verbal invocation to be left at peace, never to be touched or disturbed in any way shape or form. It is believed that humans who are seeking something from the ancestor spirits and the nature guardians to pray and ask for blessings respectfully before any activity that will ignite their reactions ("po" after a protective invocation is said before any kind of interaction on the words and on the land). The ancestor spirits are traditionally believed to be appeased when the human is about to touch or step on the Anito's territory, and demands great respect when addressed in most nature-based systems when a human is traversing or stepping on any land that the Diwatas, Nuno, Nuno sa Puno (Ancestor Spirits) and Nuno sa Punso (Heart of Nature Guardians) reside in. A "Nuno sa Punso" "Nuno", ("land and elemental guardian" and "land ancestor") is believed to be left at peace and never to be disturbed in any circumstances in any dimensionality, else there will be some unfavorable consequences for the people who have disturbed the ancestors, and spirit guardians. Traditionally,most of the ancestor spirits, and guardians who keep the peace between the non-human world and the human world (Diwatas, Nuno, and Nuno sa Puno, Nuno sa Punso) are sent offerings of prayer in traditional pre-colonial animistic nature-based prayer circles, where offerings of fruit, gold, and precious metals, fermented coconut or coconut water, river water and tobacco are offered to appease the spirit deities, so they can make Bathala (Traditional Pre-colonial Life Creator in the Philippines) is satisfied to maintain peace in the spiritual and human realms.

There are three general types of non-human spirits. The first are the environmental or nature spirits "bound" to a particular location or natural phenomenon (similar to genii loci). They "own" places and concepts like agricultural fields, forests, cliffs, seas, winds, lightning, or realms in the spirit world. Some were also "keepers" or totems of various animals and plants. They have inhuman and abstract qualities, reflecting their particular dominions. They do not normally appear in human form and are usually gender-less or androgynous. They rarely concern themselves with human affairs. Rituals involving these spirits are almost always conducted outdoors.

The second type of spirits are the "unbound" spirits which have independent existence. They appear in animal (usually as birds) or human-like forms, have gender differentiation, and have personal names. They are most similar to the fairies of European folklore. These are the most common types of spirits to become abyan (spirit guides of babaylan), as they are the most "sociable" and can take interest in human activities. These spirits are usually referred to as engkanto (from Spanish encanto) in modern Filipino folklore. Unlike the "bound" spirits, these spirits can be invited into human households, and their rituals can take place both outdoors and indoors.

The last is a class of malevolent spirits or demons, as well as supernatural beings, generally collectively known as aswang, yawa, or mangalos (also mangalok, mangangalek, or magalos) among Tagalogs and Visayans. There are numerous kinds of aswang with specific abilities, behavior, or appearance. Examples include sigbin, wakwak, tiyanak, and manananggal. The first two categories of diwata can also be malevolent, what sets the third category apart is that they can not be appealed to with offerings and they are utterly pitiless. Most practices associated with them is to ward them off, banish them, or destroy them. They are never addressed nor worshiped in religious rituals.

Diwata are rarely spoken about openly for fear of attracting their attention. Instead they are referred to with euphemisms like "those unlike us" (Visayan: dili ingon nato) or various names, like banwaanon or taga-banwa, that translate literally to "dweller of a place". Among Tagalogs, non-human nature spirits are also euphemistically referred to as lamanglupa ("[dwellers of] the bowels of the earth") or lamangdagat ("[dwellers of] the depths of the sea"), depending on their domain.

Diwata exist in both the material world and the spirit world. They can be formless or have a material body. They can also take over a body through spirit possession (Visayan: hola, hulak, tagdug, or saob; Tagalog: sanib), an ability essential for the séances in pag-anito. They are believed to be capable of shapeshifting (baliw or baylo), becoming invisible, or creating visions or illusions (anino or landung, lit. "shadow"). Their powers, however, are limited to their particular domain. A diwata of a forest, for instance, has no dominion over the sea. Most are generally benevolent or capriciously neutral, although they can cause misfortunes and illnesses if angered, disrespected, or mistakenly encountered. Other common characteristics of diwata are that they are perceived as an invisible "cold" presence (in contrast to "warm" human spirits); that they leave no footprints (unlike human spirits); and that they sense the world and "eat" by means of smelling. Diwata who take human form are said to be pale-skinned and could be distinguished from humans by the absence of a philtrum on the upper lip.

Diwata are often depicted as appearing to unsuspecting people in human or animal form, sometimes causing unintentional harm. They can also deliberately play tricks on mortals, like seducing or abducting beautiful men and women into the spirit world. Certain places are believed to be owned by diwata or are borders to the spirit world. These are normally avoided or only entered with precautions, especially during twilight when diwata are believed to cross over from the spirit world into the material world. Harm or illness caused by diwata are known as buyag in Visayan and usog in Tagalog. People who were harmed by interactions with diwata are euphemistically described as having been "greeted" (Visayan: gibati, Tagalog: nabati) or "played with" (Visayan gidulaan, Tagalog: napaglaruan or nakatuwaan) by diwata.

To avoid inadvertently angering a diwata, Filipinos perform a customary pasintabi sa nuno ("respectfully apologizing or asking permission from ancestors for passing"). This is done by saying the phrases "tao po" ("a human [is passing], elder), "tabi po" or "tabi apo" ("by your permission, elder") when passing by a place believed to  be inhabited by a diwata.

Diwata are also believed to be able to mate with humans. People born with congenital disorders (like albinism or syndactyly) or display unusual beauty or behavior are commonly believed by local superstition to be the children of diwata who seduced (or sometimes raped) their mothers.

During the Spanish period, diwata were syncretized with elves and fairies in European mythology and folklore, and were given names like duende (goblin or dwarf), encantador or encanto ("spell [caster]"), hechicero ("sorcerer"), sirena ("mermaid"), or maligno ("evil [spirit]"). In Islamized ethnic groups of the Philippines, these nature spirits are usually called jinn or saitan, due to the influence of Islamic mythology.

Religious objects and places

Taotao figures

Ancestor spirits were usually represented by carved figures. These were known as taotao ("little human", also taotaohan, latawo, tinatao, or  tatao), bata-bata ("little child"), ladaw ("image" or "likeness"; also laraw, ladawang, lagdong, or larawan), or likha ("creation"; also likhak) in most of the Philippines. Other names include bulul (also bulol or bul-ul) among the Ifugao; tinagtaggu (also tinattaggu) among the Kankanaey and Tuwali Ifugao; lablabbon among the Itneg; manaug among the Lumad; and tagno among Bicolanos.  Among Tagalogs, taotao were also sometimes referred to as lambana ("altar" or "sacred place"), after the location in which they are usually kept.

Taotao were usually austere roughly-carved figures made from wood, stone, or ivory. Some taoatao encountered by the Spanish were made from precious metals or ornamented with gold and jewelry, but these were very rare. Taotao were almost always depicted in the squatting position with the arms crossed over the knees, which is reminiscent of the fetal position, the everyday conversing posture, and the position bodies are arranged during death among Ancient Filipinos. Some figures, however, are depicted standing or doing everyday activities like dancing, pounding rice, or nursing infants.

Most taotao represent an actual deceased person, usually carved by the community upon their funeral. As such, there can be hundreds of taotao in a single village, some of them centuries old. 

In very rare cases, diwata can be depicted as taotao in anthropomorphic form, as chimeras or legendary creatures, or as animals. These include a special class of figures called hipag among the Igorot which depict war deities, as well as kinabigat (carved houseposts) and hogang (carved tree fern posts used as boundary markers and as wards against harm). As a rule, however, diwata are not usually depicted as taotao or by any man-made representations.

Taotao were not intrinsically sacred. They were representations of the spirits, not the actual spirits themselves. They only became sacred during their use in a pag-anito ritual. Without the spirit they represent, they are treated as mundane carved pieces of wood or sculpted stone. The anonymous author of the 1572 Relación de la conquista de la isla de Luzón describes pag-anito rituals of the Tagalog people as such:

When any chief is ill, he invites his kindred and orders a great meal to be prepared, consisting of fish, meat, and wine. When the guests are all assembled and the feast set forth in a few plates on the ground inside the house, they seat themselves also on the ground to eat. In the midst of the feast (called manganito or baylán in their tongue), they put the idol called Batala and certain aged women who are considered as priestesses, and some aged Indians—neither more nor less. They offer the idol some of the food which they are eating, and call upon him in their tongue, praying to him for the health of the sick man for whom the feast is held. The natives of these islands have no altars nor temples whatsoever. This manganito, or drunken revel, to give it a better name, usually lasts seven or eight days; and when it is finished they take the idols and put them in the corners of the house, and keep them there without showing them any reverence.

Regardless, very old taotao handed down through generations are prized as family heirlooms. Among the Igorot, pieces of taotao may also be chipped off and boiled into a medicinal tea.

Taotao were commonly kept in corners or small shelves inside houses or granaries. Spanish missionaries recorded that taotao were present in every Filipino household, no matter how poor.

When Spanish missionaries arrived in the Philippines, the word "anito" came to be associated with these physical representations of spirits that featured prominently in pag-anito rituals. During the American rule of the Philippines (1898–1946), the meaning of the Spanish word idolo ("a thing worshiped") was further conflated with the English word "idol". Thus in the modern Filipino language, anito has come to refer almost exclusively to the carved taotao figures, instead of the actual spirits themselves.

Shrines, altars, and sacred areas

Ancient Filipinos and Filipinos who continue to adhere to the indigenous Philippine folk religions generally do not have so-called "temples" of worship under the context known to foreign cultures. However, they do have sacred shrines, which are also called as spirit houses. They can range in size from small roofed platforms, to structures similar to a small house (but with no walls), to shrines that look similar to pagodas, especially in the south where early mosques were also modeled in the same way. These shrines were known in various indigenous terms, which depend on the ethnic group association. They can also be used as places to store taotao and caskets of ancestors. Among Bicolanos, taotao were also kept inside sacred caves called moog.

During certain ceremonies, anito are venerated through temporary altars near sacred places. These were called latangan or lantayan in Visayan and dambana or lambana in Tagalog. These bamboo or rattan altars are identical in basic construction throughout most of the Philippines. They were either small roof-less platforms or standing poles split at the tip (similar to a tiki torch). They held halved coconut shells, metal plates, or martaban jars as receptacles for offerings. Taotao may sometimes also be placed on these platforms.

Other types of sacred places or objects of worship of diwata include the material manifestation of their realms. The most widely venerated were balete trees (also called nonok, nunuk, nonoc, etc.) and anthills or termite mounds (punso). Other examples include mountains, waterfalls, tree groves, reefs, and caves.

Spirit animals

Some animals like crocodiles, snakes, monitor lizards, tokay geckos, and various birds were also venerated as servants or manifestations of diwata, or as powerful spirits themselves. These include legendary creatures like the dragon or serpent Bakunawa, the giant bird Minokawa of the Bagobo, and the colorful Sarimanok of the Maranao.

Omen birds were particularly important. The most common omen birds were doves with green or blue iridescent feathers called limokon (usually the common emerald dove, imperial pigeons, or brown doves). Other omen birds include fairy-bluebirds (tigmamanukan, balan tikis, balatiti, or bathala among Tagalogs; and batala among Kapampangans); kingfishers (salaksak among the Ilocano, Igorot, and Sambal); and flowerpeckers (pitpit, ichaw, ido, or labeg among the Igorot).

Rituals and shamans

Anitism was not a religion about worship. Aside from good ancestor spirits and the few benevolent diwata, most anito were feared, not venerated. To an ordinary person, diwata were regarded as dangerous beings to be avoided or appeased. When interaction was necessary, they performed a ritual known as pag-anito (also mag-anito or anitohan). These are usually directed at ancestor spirits. When the pag-anito ceremony is for a diwata, the ritual is known as pagdiwata (also magdiwata or diwatahan).

Minor pag-anito rituals like praying for better weather or banishing minor ill luck can be performed by any householder. However, major pag-anito rituals required the services of the community shaman (Visayan babaylan or baylan; Tagalog katalonan or manganito).

These shamans were believed to have been "chosen" by a specific diwata who become their spirit guides. This was presumed to happen after they pass the initiation rites of an older shaman they were apprenticed to (usually a relative). In some cases, some shamans acquire their status after they recover from a serious illness or a bout of insanity. In most Filipino ethnic groups, shamans were almost always female. The few males who gain shaman status were usually asog or bayok, trans women.

Major pag-anito rituals are centered around a séance. Because of their special relationship with their companion spirits, shamans can act as mediums for other anito, allowing spirits to temporarily possess their bodies. This possession happens after the shaman goes into a trance-like state. This allows the spirit to communicate verbally with the participants as well as physically act out events in the spirit world. At the moment of possession, shamans display a change in behavior and voice. They can sometimes go into seizures and become violent enough that restraints are required. The ritual ends when the spirit leaves and the shaman is awakened.

Spirits were invited into the ritual through offerings and sacrifices during and after the ceremonies. These depended on what spirit was being summoned, but offerings are usually a small portion of the harvests, cooked food, wine, gold ornaments, and betel nut. Blood from an animal was also usually part of the offerings, poured directly on the taotao or in a bowl before them. These commonly come from chickens or pigs, but can also be from carabaos or dogs. Salt and spices are usually avoided, as they are believed to be distasteful to anito. There is no record of human sacrifices being offered to anito during the Spanish period of the Philippines, except among the Bagobo people in southern Mindanao where it was prevalent until the early 20th century.

Another common pag-anito ritual throughout most of the Philippine ethnic groups involves the use of spirit boats. These were usually miniature boats laden with offerings set adrift from riverbanks and shorelines.

Pag-anito can be conducted on its own or in conjunction with other rituals and celebrations. They can be personal or family rituals or seasonal community events. They can vary considerably between different ethnic groups. The most common pag-anito were entreaties for bountiful harvests, cures for illnesses, victory in battle, prayers for the dead, or blessings.

Different ethnic groups had different diwata pantheons and rituals associated with them, though sometimes deities are shared in neighboring ethnic groups. Moreover, different communities also each have their own local patron diwata.

Historical accounts
Historical accounts of anito in Spanish records include the following:

"Most of the Indians are heathens...They believe in their ancestors, and when about to embark upon some enterprise commend themselves to these, asking them for aid." – Francisco de Sande, Relacion de las Yslas Filipinas (1576)
"Which treats of the rites and ceremonies observed by the Moros in the vicinity of Manilla, and of their social conditions. The god Batala. According to the religion formerly observed by these Moros, they worshiped a deity called among them Batala, which properly means “God.” They said that they adored this Batala because he was the Lord of all, and had created human beings and villages. They said that this Batala had many agents under him, whom he sent to this world to produce, in behalf of men, what is yielded here. These beings were called anitos, and each anito had a special office. Some of them were for the fields, and some for those who journey by sea; some for those who went to war, and some for diseases. Each anito was therefore named for his office; there was, for instance, the anito of the fields, and the anito of the rain. To these anitos the people offered sacrifices, when they desired anything—to each one according to his office. The mode of sacrifice was like that of the Pintados. They summoned a catalonan, which is the same as the vaylan among the Pintados, that is, a priest. He offered the sacrifice, requesting from the anito whatever the people desired him to ask, and heaping up great quantities of rice, meat, and fish. His invocations lasted until the demon entered his body, when the catalonan fell into a swoon, foaming at the mouth. The Indians sang, drank, and feasted until the catalonan came to himself, and told them the answer that the anito had given to him. If the sacrifice was in behalf of a sick person, they offered many golden chains and ornaments, saying that they were paying a ransom for the sick person's health. This invocation of the anito continued as long as the sickness lasted."

"When the natives were asked why the sacrifices were offered to the anito, and not to the Batala, they answered that the Batala was a great lord, and no one could speak to him. He lived in the sky; but the anito, who was of such a nature that he came down here to talk with men, was to the Batala as a minister, and interceded for them. In some places and especially in the mountain districts, when the father, mother, or other relative dies, the people unite in making a small wooden idol, and preserve it. Accordingly there is a house which contains one hundred or two hundred of these idols. These images also are called anitos; for they say that when people die, they go to serve the Batala. Therefore they make sacrifices to these anitos, offering them food, wine, and gold ornaments; and request them to be intercessors for them before the Batala, whom they regard as God." – Miguel de Loarca, Relacion de las Yslas Filipinas (1582)

"They held the cayman in the utmost veneration; and, whenever they made any statement about it, when they descried it in the water, they called it Nono, which means "grandfather." They softly and tenderly besought it not to harm them; and to this end offered it a part of what they carried in their boats, casting the offering into the water. There was no old tree to which they did not attribute divinity; and it was a sacrilege to cut such a tree for any purpose. What more did they adore? the very stones, cliffs, and reefs, and the headlands of the shores of the sea or the rivers; and they made some offering when they passed by these, going to the stone or rock, and placing the offering upon it. I saw many times in the river of Manila a rock which for many years was an idol of that wretched people... While sailing along the island of Panai I beheld on the promontory called Nasso, near Potol, plates and other pieces of earthenware, laid upon a rock, the offering of voyagers. In the island of Mindanao between La Canela and the river [i.e., Rio Grande], a great promontory projects from a rugged and steep coast; always at these points there is a heavy sea, making it both difficult and dangerous to double them. When passing by this headland, the natives, as it was so steep, offered their arrows, discharging them with such force that they penetrated the rock itself. This they did as a sacrifice, that a safe passage might be accorded them." – Fr. Pedro Chirino, Relacion de las Islas Filipinas (1604)
"They also adored private idols, which each one inherited from his ancestors. The Visayans called them divata, and the Tagálogs anito. Of those idols some had jurisdiction over the mountains and open country, and permission was asked from them to go thither. Others had jurisdiction over the sowed fields, and the fields were commended to them so that they might prove fruitful; and besides the sacrifices they placed articles of food in the fields for the anitos to eat, in order to place them under greater obligations. There was an anito of the sea, to whom they commended their fisheries and navigations; an anito of the house, whose favor they implored whenever an infant was born, and when it was suckled and the breast offered to it. They placed their ancestors, the invocation of whom was the first thing in all their work and dangers, among these anitos. In memory of their ancestors they kept certain very small and very badly made idols of stone, wood, gold, or ivory, called licha or laravan. Among their gods they reckoned also all those who perished by the sword, or who were devoured by crocodiles, as well as those killed by lightning. They thought that the souls of such immediately ascended to the blest abode by means of the rainbow, called by them balañgao. Generally, whoever could succeed in it attributed divinity to his aged father at his death. The aged themselves died in that presumptuous delusion, and during their sickness and at their death guided all their actions with what they imagined a divine gravity and manner. Consequently, they chose as the place for their grave some assigned spot, like one old man who lived on the seacoast between Dulac and Abuyog, which is in the island of Leyte. He ordered himself placed there in his coffin (as was done) in a house standing alone and distant from the settlement, in order that he might be recognized as a god of navigators, who were to commend themselves to him. Another had himself buried in certain lands in the mountains of Antipolo, and through reverence to him no one dared to cultivate those lands (for they feared that he who should do so would die), until an evangelical minister removed that fear from them, and now they cultivate them without harm or fear." – Fr. Francisco Colin, Labor Evangelica (1663)

In popular culture

Festivals
The Babaylan Festival of Bago, Negros Occidental, with the accompanying Diwata sang Bago beauty pageant,  is a street dancing festival celebrating the Visayan traditions of anito and shamans
The Kamarikutan Pagdiwata Arts Festival of Puerto Princesa is inspired by the preserved ritual of pagdiwata among the Tagbanwa people of Palawan.

Film and television
Amaya, a historical television series about the precolonial Philippines. It depicts diwata as goddesses.
Diwata (1987), a movie directed by Tata Esteban and written by Rei Nicandro showed the mythical life of the deities. Actress Olga Miranda played the main role, together with the other cast Lala Montelibano, Dick Israel and George Estregan.
Encantadia and Mulawin, two television series (with film adaptations) in a shared universe depicts diwatas as a race of supernatural being living in Encantadia, a dimension beyond the human world.
Faraway (2014), an independent film focuses on a woman and her quest to find the Diwata tribe.
Indio, a television series with a protagonist that is the son of a mortal man and a diwata woman.
Okay Ka, Fairy Ko!, a television fantasy situational comedy series (with film adaptations) that revolves around a mortal man married to a diwata.

Games
 Anito: Defend a Land Enraged is a role-playing game released in 2003 by Anino Entertainment. It was the first  video game to be produced and designed entirely by a team of Filipino game developers, and is credited for helping spawn the birth of the game development industry in the Philippines.
One of the abilities of the character Titania (added on August 19, 2016) in Warframe is a sword known as diwata.
Project Tadhana, a tabletop role-playing game released in 2017 features Diwata as one of its playable races (or lahi) together with Engkanto, Tikbalang, Aswang, and Tao.
Makia:Tales of the Forest, a visual novel released in 2020 explores the story of

Literature
One of the main characters from the play Speech & Debate written by Stephen Karam is a woman with Filipino ancestry named Diwata.
Marvel Comics has introduced the "Diwatas" as a pantheon of gods similar to the Asgardians and Olympians.  These Diwatas include Aman Sinaya, Amihan, Anitun, Apo Laki, Aswang, Bathala, Mayari and Tala.

Music
"Diwata", a song released by rapper Abra featuring Parokya Ni Edgar vocalist Chito Miranda, from his self-titled debut album.

Science
Diwata-1 and Diwata-2, the first Philippine microsatellites launched in 2016 and 2018, respectively, were named after diwata.

Notes

See also

Philippine mythology
Atua – the Polynesian derivative belief of Anito
Gabâ
Genius loci
Daemon (classical mythology)
Hantu
Hyang
Kaharingan
Kami
Kodama
Kupua
Menehune
Moai
Nuku-mai-tore
Patupaiarehe
Soul dualism
Taotao Mona
Toraja
Tiki
Yōkai
Yorishiro

References

External links
Pagdiwata Ritual of the Tagbanwa in the ICH Digital Archives, ICHCAP, UNESCO

Austronesian spirituality
Indigenous Philippine folk religions
Philippine mythology
Domestic and hearth deities
Tutelary deities
Nature spirits
Tree deities
Psychopomps